Daniel Ricardo Escuela (born 23 May 1983) is an Argentine road cyclist, who currently rides for UCI Continental team .

Major results
2006
 1st Stage 7 Giro Ciclistico d'Italia
2008
 8th Philadelphia International Cycling Classic
2009
 2nd Road race, National Road Championships
2012
 2nd Road race, National Road Championships
2017
 4th Overall Vuelta a San Juan

References

External links

1983 births
Living people
Argentine male cyclists